Richard Steigmann-Gall (Born October 3, 1965) is an Associate Professor of History at Kent State University, and the former Director of the Jewish Studies Program from 2004 to 2010.

Education 
He received his BA in history in 1989 and MA in European History in 1992 from the University of Michigan, and his PhD in European History in 1999 from the University of Toronto.

Career 
On September 30, 2009 Steigmann-Gall was featured on the History Channel in a sensationalist documentary discussing Hitler's religious views.

Since 2016, Steigmann-Gall has turned his attention to the question of fascism in the United States. He published a scholarly article named "Star-Spangled Fascism" in the journal Social History that explores the traditions of American historical writing, and the ways in which the American far right in the period between World Wars I and II can be called fascist in spite of these traditions. For the last several years, he has turned to public commentary on the question of fascism in contemporary American politics. His articles on this can be found in Tikkun, the Huffington Post, Politico, and Jacobin.

The Holy Reich 
In 2003, Steigmann-Gall published The Holy Reich through Cambridge University Press, which explored Nazi conceptions of Christianity. The Holy Reich argues that the Nazi Party was not anti-Christian as popularly understood, nor was it in any sense a paganist movement. Rather, Steigmann-Gall writes that many in the Nazi Party leadership believed themselves and their movement to be inherently Christian (positive Christianity). 

The Holy Reich has been translated into Spanish, Portuguese, and Italian. A symposium on the book was published by the Journal of Contemporary History in 2007.

See also
 Adolf Hitler's religious views
 German Christians (movement)
 Positive Christianity
 Religion in Nazi Germany
 Religious aspects of Nazism

References

External links
Faculty Page at Kent University'
Dissertation: "The Holy Reich: Religious Dimensions of Nazi Ideology, 1919-1945" (1999)
Introduction to The Holy Reich - courtesy Cambridge University Press
Christianity and the Nazi Movement: A response to critics - by Richard Steigmann-Gall
Richard Steigmann-Gall Interview - by Stephen Crittenden, The Religion Report

21st-century American historians
21st-century American male writers
Kent State University faculty
Historians of Nazism
University of Michigan College of Literature, Science, and the Arts alumni
University of Toronto alumni
Living people
1965 births
American male non-fiction writers